Robertsham is a suburb of Johannesburg, South Africa. It is situated in the city's southern suburbs just south of the CBD. It is located in Region F of the City of Johannesburg Metropolitan Municipality.

History
The suburb is situated on an old Witwatersrand farm of Ormonde. It was purchased by Kalven Estates in 1948 and proclaimed on 14 April 1948 and would be named after the company's chairman Robert Shapiro. The word -ham, in the United Kingdom and Ireland is a suffix used in place names meaning farm or homestead.

Education
Sir John Adamson Secondary School is located in the area.
Robertsham Primary School is located here.
Theo Wassenaar Laerskool is a primary school.
Alhuda Academy is an Islamic school.

References

Johannesburg Region F